This is a list of foreign presidential trips made by Gloria Macapagal Arroyo, the 14th president of the Philippines from 2001 to 2010. During her ten-year presidency, Arroyo has visited a total of 44 countries. With a total of 127 foreign trips, Arroyo has made the most foreign trips by a Philippine president in office.

Summary of international trips

List of international trips

See also
 Foreign relations of the Philippines
 List of international presidential trips made by Joseph Estrada
 List of international presidential trips made by Benigno Aquino III
 List of international presidential trips made by Rodrigo Duterte
 List of international presidential trips made by Bongbong Marcos

References

External links
|Presidential Trips: The full list – List of presidential trips by the Official Gazette

Presidency of Gloria Macapagal Arroyo
2001 in international relations
2002 in international relations
2003 in international relations
2004 in international relations
2005 in international relations
2006 in international relations
2007 in international relations
2008 in international relations
2009 in international relations
2010 in international relations
Arroyo, Gloria Macapagal